The 1992 Tournament of the Americas, later known as the FIBA Americas Championship and the FIBA AmeriCup, was a basketball championship hosted by the United States from June 27 to July 5, 1992.  The games were played at the Memorial Coliseum in Portland, Oregon. This FIBA AmeriCup was to earn the four berths allocated to the Americas for the 1992 Summer Olympics in Barcelona. It was the international debut of the Dream Team, which defeated Venezuela in the final to win the tournament. Puerto Rico and Brazil made the semifinals to also qualify for the Olympics.

Qualification
Eight teams qualified during the qualification tournaments held in their respective zones in 1991; USA and Canada qualified automatically since they are the only two members of the North America zone.
North America: , 
Caribbean and Central America:, 

The draw split the tournament into two groups:
 
Group A

 
Group B

Format
The top three teams from each group advance to the knockout round.
The winners in the knockout semifinals advanced to the Final and were granted berths in the 1992 Olympic Tournament in Barcelona. The losers figure in a third-place playoff and were both also granted berths in the Olympic Tournament.

Squads

Preliminary round

Group A

|}

Group B

|}

Knockout round

Championship bracket

Awards

Final standings

References
 1992 American Olympic Qualifying Tournament for Men, FIBA.com.

1992
1991–92 in American basketball
International basketball competitions hosted by the United States
1991–92 in North American basketball
1991–92 in South American basketball